Baseball at the 2011 Pan American Games in Guadalajara was held between October 19 and 25, 2011. All games were played at the Pan American Baseball Stadium in Lagos de Moreno, Mexico. The draw for the competition took place in July 2011, in which the eight teams were drawn into two groups of four.

Baseball was competed by men only, while women competed in the similar sport of softball. Each team could enter a team of 24 athletes for a maximum of 192 competitors for this tournament. The tournament was played using designated hitter rules.

Cuba entered the tournament having won 10 consecutive baseball gold medals at the Pan American Games, dating back to 1971. Canada won the tournament, defeating the United States in the gold medal game. Cuba finished in third place, winning the bronze medal.

Medal summary

Medal table

Medalists

Schedule
The competition was spread out across seven days.

Teams

Qualifying Summary
The hosts Mexico, along with the top seven teams at the Pan American Qualification tournament qualified to compete at the games.

Participants

Format
 Eight teams are split into 2 preliminary round groups of 4 teams each. The top 2 teams from each group qualify for the knockout stage.
 The third and fourth placed teams in each group will play each other for fifth and seventh place respectively.
 In the semifinals, the matchups are as follows: A1 vs. B2 and B1 vs. A2
 The winning teams from the semifinals play for the gold medal. The losing teams compete for the bronze medal.

Ties are broken via the following the criteria, with the first option used first, all the way down to the last option:
 Head to head results.
 Run average (not the run difference) between the tied teams.

Preliminary round
All times are local Central Daylight Time (UTC−5)

Group A

Group B

Elimination stage

Seventh place match

Fifth place match

Semifinals

Bronze medal match

Gold medal match

Final standings

Statistics leaders

Batting

Pitching

References

External links
Schedule

 
Events at the 2011 Pan American Games
Pan American Games
2011
2011 Pan American Games